Ivan Yefimovitch Voronaev (Nikita Petrovitch Tcherkasov) – leader and founder of Pentecostal movement in Ukraine and more broadly in the Russian Empire and the Soviet Union. He was born about 1885 in Orenburg.

This American immigrant introduced Pentecostalism to Russia, Ukraine and some other Slavic nations. The first Russian-language Pentecostal church in Manhattan was founded by I. Voronaev in 1919.

In 1920 Ivan Voronaev traveled with Gustav Smith through Western and Southern Ukraine, where they established many new Pentecostal communities, beginning with a Pentecostal community in Odessa. Over 350 congregations in Russia, Ukraine, Poland, Bulgaria were eventually founded. In 1926, the preacher published "Short Catechesis of Christian Evangelical Faith (CEF)".

Voronaev was arrested by Soviet militia in 1929 and sent to Siberia. In 1937, he was arrested again and sentenced to death and executed by the NKVD.

References

 Ivan Voronaev: The Death of a Hero is a Legacy to Remember, Cup & Cross Ministries International.
 The Life and Ministry of Rev. Ivan Voronaev
 История церкви под влиянием Святого Духа - German: Kirchengeschichte unter dem Einfluss des Heiligen Geistes .
 Н. Усач, В. Ткаченко. Посланник Пятидесятницы (Иван Воронаев и сподвижники). — Винница: Слово Христианина, 2007. — Т. 1. — С. 261. — 408 с. — .

Ukrainian Christian religious leaders
Russian religious leaders
Russian Pentecostals
1880s births
Year of death missing
Ukrainian Pentecostals
Great Purge victims